Barber Lake may refer to:

Barber Lake (Alberta)
Barber Lake (Nova Scotia)